Wick's theorem is a method of reducing high-order derivatives to a combinatorics problem. It is named after Italian physicist  Gian-Carlo Wick. It is used extensively in quantum field theory to reduce arbitrary products of creation and annihilation operators to sums of products of pairs of these operators. This allows for the use of Green's function methods, and consequently the use of Feynman diagrams in the field under study. A more general idea in probability theory is Isserlis' theorem.

In perturbative quantum field theory, Wick's theorem is used to quickly rewrite each time ordered summand in the Dyson series as a sum of normal ordered terms.  In the limit of asymptotically free ingoing and outgoing states, these terms correspond to Feynman diagrams.

Definition of contraction 
For two operators  and  we define their contraction to be

where  denotes the normal order of an operator .

They satisfy the commutation relations for bosonic operators , or the anti-commutation relations for fermionic operators  where  denotes the Kronecker delta.

We then have

where .

These relationships hold true for bosonic operators or fermionic operators because of the way normal ordering is defined.

Examples 

We can use contractions and normal ordering to express any product of creation and annihilation operators as a sum of normal ordered terms. This is the basis of Wick's theorem. Before stating the theorem fully we shall look at some examples.

Example 1 

Note that we have not changed  but merely re-expressed it in another form as

Example 2

Example 3 

In the last line we have used different numbers of  symbols to denote different contractions. By repeatedly applying the commutation relations it takes a lot of work, as you can see, to express  in the form of a sum of normally ordered products. It is an even lengthier calculation for more complicated products.

Luckily Wick's theorem provides a shortcut.

Statement of the theorem 

A product of creation and annihilation operators  can be expressed as

In other words, a string of creation and annihilation operators can be rewritten as the normal-ordered product of the string, plus the normal-ordered product after all single contractions among operator pairs, plus all double contractions, etc., plus all full contractions.

Applying the theorem to the above examples provides a much quicker method to arrive at the final expressions.

A warning: In terms on the right hand side containing multiple contractions care must be taken when the operators are fermionic. In this case an appropriate minus sign must be introduced according to the following rule: rearrange the operators (introducing minus signs whenever the order of two fermionic operators is swapped) to ensure the contracted terms are adjacent in the string. The contraction can then be applied (See "Rule C" in Wick's paper).

Example:

If we have two fermions with creation and annihilation operators  and  then

Note that the term with contractions of the two creation operators and of the two annihilation operators is not included because their contractions vanish.

Proof of Wick's theorem 
We use induction to prove the theorem for bosonic creation and annihilation operators. The  base case is trivial, because there is only one possible contraction:

In general, the only non-zero contractions are between an annihilation operator on the left and a creation operator on the right. By Wick's theorem applied to  operators, we have:

 is either a creation operator or an annihilation operator. Thus, we can add all contractions involving  to the sums without changing their value.

Now, suppose that  is an annihilation operator. To move   from the left-hand side to the right-hand side of all the
products, we repeatedly swap  with the operator immediately right of it (call it ), each time applying  to account for noncommutativity. Once we do this, all terms will be normal ordered. All terms added to the sums by pushing  through the products correspond to additional contractions involving .

We have proved the base case and the induction step, so the theorem is true. By introducing the appropriate minus signs, the proof can be extended to fermionic creation and annihilation operators. The theorem applied to fields is proved in essentially the same way.

Wick's theorem applied to fields 

The correlation function that appears in quantum field theory can be expressed by a contraction on the field operators:

where the operator  are the amount that do not annihilate the vacuum state . Which means that . Note that the contraction of a time-ordered string of two field operators is a C-number.

In the end, we arrive at Wick's theorem:

The T-product of a time-ordered free fields string can be expressed in the following manner:

Applying this theorem to S-matrix elements, we discover that normal-ordered terms acting on vacuum state give a null contribution to the sum. We conclude that m is even and only completely contracted terms remain.

where p is the number of interaction fields (or, equivalently, the number of interacting particles) and n is the development order (or the number of vertices of interaction). For example, if 

This is analogous to the corresponding Isserlis' theorem in statistics for the moments of a Gaussian distribution.

Note that this discussion is in terms of the usual definition of normal ordering which is appropriate for the vacuum expectation values (VEV's) of fields.  (Wick's theorem provides as a way of expressing VEV's of n fields in terms of VEV's of two fields.)  There are any other possible definitions of normal ordering, and Wick's theorem is valid irrespective. However Wick's theorem only simplifies computations if the definition of normal ordering used is changed to match the type of expectation value wanted.  That is we always want the expectation value of the normal ordered product to be zero.  For instance in
thermal field theory a different type of expectation value, a thermal trace over the density matrix, requires a different definition of normal ordering.

See also 
 Isserlis' theorem

References

Further reading 
  (§4.3)
  (Chapter 13, Sec c)

Quantum field theory
Scattering theory
Physics theorems